Ciaran Greene (born 14 June 1987) is an Irish sportsperson..

From Letterkenny and a graduate of St Eunan's College and Institute of Technology, Sligo, Greene has played Gaelic football for St Eunan's and been a member of the Donegal county team.

With his Gaelic football club he won three consecutive senior county championships in the 2000s.He hasn't yet stopped celebrating.

Greene has also played soccer for several teams in various leagues, including Institute, Omagh Town, Derry City, Sligo Rovers, Finn Harps and Letterkenny Rovers.

As of 2014, he lived in London. In April 2021, Greene was promoted to Sales Director of construction recruitment firm, 3D Personnel.

Honours
 Donegal Senior Football Championship: 2007, 2008, 2009, 2012

References

External links
 
 

1987 births
Living people
Association footballers from County Donegal
Association football midfielders
Donegal inter-county Gaelic footballers
Finn Harps F.C. players
Gaelic footballers who switched code
NIFL Premiership players
Institute F.C. players
League of Ireland players
Letterkenny Rovers F.C. players
Omagh Town F.C. players
People educated at St Eunan's College
People from Letterkenny
Republic of Ireland association footballers
Sligo Rovers F.C. players
St Eunan's Gaelic footballers